Nettastoma is a genus of eels in the duckbill eel family Nettastomatidae.

Species
There are currently five recognized species in this genus:
 Nettastoma falcinaris Parin & Karmovskaya, 1985
 Nettastoma melanurum Rafinesque, 1810 (Blackfin sorcerer)
 Nettastoma parviceps Günther, 1877 (Duck-billed eel) (syn. N. denticulatus)
 Nettastoma solitarium Castle & D. G. Smith, 1981 (Solitary duck-billed eel)
 Nettastoma syntresis D. G. Smith & J. E. Böhlke, 1981

Formerly Included Species
 Nettastoma elongatum Kotthaus, 1968 (slender sorcerer) - valid as Saurenchelys cancrivora

References

Nettastomatidae
Taxa named by Constantine Samuel Rafinesque